is a Japanese voice actor and singer. He is currently affiliated with Axlone.

Biography
Mizushima is a former Japan Ground Self-Defense Force official. He entered the JGSDF Youth Technical School, a boarding school for boys, as a member of the 38th class of JGSDF students, and graduated in 1994. He has been a member of Production Baobab since around 2000, and left at the end of May 2011 to become a member of Axlone in June 2011. In 2012, he became an instructor at Axl Zero, a training school directly under the Axlone office.

In 2014, he announced the start of his music career under the name TAKA, and made his debut as a singer with his first mini-album "Reflection" in March of the same year.

Filmography

Anime television
2002
 Shrine of the Morning Mist – Tadahiro Amatsu
 Crush Gear Turbo – Rudolf Steiner
 Forza! Hidemaru – Golbo
 G-On Riders – Bankara, Man (C)
 Witch Hunter Robin – Witch, Security Guard

2003
 D.N.Angel – Eliot
 Full Metal Panic! Fumoffu – Kojima
 Hikaru no Go – Chinese Pro
 Machine Robo Rescue – Moriyama
 PoPoLoCrois – Billy
 Scrapped Princess – Christopher Armalite
 Stellvia of the Universe – Kota Otoyama

2004
 Detective Conan – Rescue Workers
 Desert Punk – Wataru Suiden
 Gokusen – Kinoshita
 Papuwa – Nagoya Willow
 Mermaid Melody Pichi Pichi Pitch Pure – Rihito Amagi
 Onmyō Taisenki – Hiragi no Tobee; Ryūji Kamiya
 Phoenix – Adam
 Pocket Monsters Advanced Generation – Fū
 SD Gundam Force – Blue Doga
 This Ugly Yet Beautiful World – Takeru Takemoto

2005
 Magical Kanan – Hazuna
 Major 2nd Season – Player

2006
 Burst Ball Hit! Crash B-Daman – Kazuma Miyoshi
 Bartender – Ryū Sasakura
 Tokyo Tribes 2 – Secretary Guard
 Gakuen Heaven – Ozawa Wataru
 Girl's High – Takanori Shimotakanani

2007
 Getsumento Heiki Mina – Ryū Sasaki
 KimiKiss: Pure Rouge – Kazuki Aihara
 Romeo × Juliet – Romeo Candore De Montague
 Sayonara, Zetsubou-Sensei – Jun Kudō/Takashi
 My Bride is a Mermaid – Nagasumi Michishio
 D.Gray-man – Bob
 Tengen Toppa Gurren Lagann – Tetsukan; Guinble

2008
 Code Geass: Lelouch of the Rebellion R2 – Rolo Lamperouge
 Monochrome Factor – Momiji Tateyama
 Our Home's Fox Deity. – Noboru Takagami
 Seto no Hanayome (OVA, sequel) : Insert Song Performance ("Soshite Otoko no Michi")

2009
 Hetalia: Axis Powers – Finland
 Inazuma Eleven – Hiroto Kiyama/Gran
 Nintama Rantaro – Tomoyoshi (First)

2010
 Angel Beats! – Takamatsu
 Night Raid 1931 – Murasawa Lieutenant
 Giant Killing – Daisuke Tsubaki
 SD Gundam Sangokuden Brave Battle Warriors – Chouryou Messala
 Seikimatsu Occult Gakuin – Fumiaki Uchida
Stitch! ~Zutto taiko no Tomodachi~ Helzdonuts, Swapper, Couple Boy, Robot

2011
 Beelzebub – Takayuki Furuichi
 Guilty Crown – Yahiro Samukawa
 High Score – Akira Shibata
 Ground Control to Psychoelectric Girl – Nakajima
 Mashiroiro Symphony – Shingo Uryū
 Nurarihyon no Mago – Amezo
 Gosick – Gideon Lesglant

2012
 Aesthetica of a Rogue Hero – Tanaka
 Busou Shinki – Rihito Rihi
 Dog Days' – Callaway Risler
 Inu x Boku SS – Ayumu Warashibe
 Inazuma Eleven GO – Hiroto Kira
 The Knight in the Area – Kouji Yakumo, Shigeo Nishijima
 Kokoro Connect – Taichi Yaegashi
 Mysterious Girlfriend X – Ogata
 Love, Election and Chocolate – Moheiji Tatsumi
 Psycho-Pass – Masatake Mido
 Sword Art Online – Thinker
 Busou Chuugakusei: Basket Army – Tomonori

2013
 Love Lab – Satoshi Nagino
 Muromi-san – Takurō Mukōjima
 Silver Spoon – Shin'ei Ōkawa
 White Album 2 – Haruki Kitahara
 Tamagotchi! – Smartotchi
 Danball Senki – Takeru Kojō
 Little Busters! – Aikawa

2014
 Hamatora: The Animation – Takahiro Ito
 Hero Bank – Ryota Arashiyama
 Jinsei – Takao Ishikawa
 The Kindaichi Case Files R – Ikuma Shimomura

2015
 Assassination Classroom – Kōtarō Takebayashi
 Charlotte – Jōjirō Takajō
 Dog Days – Callaway Risler
 Fairy Tail – Tempesta
 Ninja Slayer From Animation – Scatter
 Saekano: How to Raise a Boring Girlfriend – Naoto
 Yona of the Dawn – Cheol-Ran

2016
 Ao Oni: The Animation – Takurō
 Aokana: Four Rhythm Across the Blue – Hayato Shirase
 Assassination Classroom 2nd Season – Kōtarō Takebayashi
 Beyblade Burst – Orochi Ginba
 Concrete Revolutio: Choujin Gensou – The Last Song – Ichiyū Wakamura
 Digimon Universe: App Monsters – Roleplaymon
 Erased – Jun Shiratori
 Haruchika: Haruta & Chika – Benjant
 Kiss Him, Not Me – Takurō Serinuma
 Puzzle & Dragons X – Torlie
 Soul Buster – Son Shin

2017
 Future Card Buddyfight X – Kesshōryū Atora
 Hozuki's Coolheadedness – Yomogi
 Tomica Hyper Rescue Drive Head Kidō Kyūkyū Keisatsu – Shun Kuroeda

2018
 Fate/Extra Last Encore – Gawain
Inazuma Eleven: Ares no Tenbin – Tatsuya Kiyama
Inazuma Eleven: Orion no Kokuin - Tatsuya Kiyama

2019
 Grimms Notes The Animation – Loki

2020
 Toilet-Bound Hanako-kun – Natsuhiko Hyūga

2021
 Heaven's Design Team – Mushibu
 Hetalia: World Stars – Finland
 Rumble Garanndoll – Megane

Original video animation (OVA)

 Kuro to kin no hirakanai kagi – Tomoomi Hasui
 Sentakuya Shinchan – Shinji Ohashi
 Ane Log: Moyako Neesan no Tomaranai Monologue – Akira Konoe
 Koe de Oshigoto! – Yukihira Yokoyama
 Kokoro Connect – Taichi Yaegashi
 Mizuiro – Student Boy (A)
 Mahō Sensei Negima: Mō Hitotsu no Sekai – Kotaro Inugami (adult form)
 Netrun-mon – Hiroyuki Nishimura
 Wet Summer Days – Hiroshi Inaba
 Tenbatsu! Angel Rabbie – Luka

Theatrical animation
2010
 Inazuma Eleven: Saikyō Gundan Ōga Shūrai – Hiroto Kiyama
2013
 Aura: Maryūinkōga Saigo no Tatakai – Dorisen
2014
 Inazuma Eleven: Chō Jigen Dream Match - Hiroto Kiyama/Gran
2017
 Ao Oni: The Animation – Shōichirō Murakami
2021
 Fate/Grand Order: Camelot – Wandering; Agaterám – Gawain

Video games

 Arcobaleno Portable – Nikichi Saotome
 Ao no Kanata no Four Rhythm – Hayato Shirase
 Berserk Millennium Falcon Arc: Chapter of the Holy Demon War – Serpico
 Code Geass Hangyaku no Lelouch R2: Banjou no Geass Gekijou – Rolo Lamperouge
 Cross Edge – Tōya Ijūin (Troy)
 Duel Savior Destiny – Selbium Bolt
 Edel Blume – Conrad Bartley
 Fate/Extra – Saber/Gawain
 Fate/Extra CCC – Saber/Gawain
 Fate/Grand Order – Gawain, Sherlock Holmes
 Fate/Extella – Gawain
 Mobile Suit Gundam: Extreme Vs. – Lane Aime
 Inazuma Eleven series – Hiroto Kiyama/Gran
 Jigsaw World: Daikettsu! Jigbattle Heroes – Mutekid
 Kimi to Study – Ryō Fujishiro
 Kokoro Connect Yochi Random – Taichi Yaegashi
 Lamento: Beyond the Void – Tokino
 Little Battlers Experience Wars – Takeru Kojō 
 Rockman Zero series – X
 Rockman ZX series – Model X
 Mobile Suit Gundam: Spirits of Zeon – Dual Stars of Carnage
 Shōnen Onmyōji: With These Wings, Return to the Skies – Koshikage
 SD Gundam G GENERATION SPIRITS – Lane Aime
 SD Gundam G GENERATION WORLD – Sheld Foley, Lane Aime
 SD Gundam G GENERATION OVER WORLD – Sheld Foley, Lane Aime
 Shuugyo Ryokou: Koto Meisou Chizu – Shōhei Nanbu
 Simple2000 The Mystery: And Everyone Disappears – Kappa
 Star Ocean: Second Evolution – Noel Chandler
 Super Robot Wars Z2: Saisei-hen – Rolo Lamperouge
 Super Robot Wars V – Lane Aime
 Tales of Graces – Hubert Ozwell
 White Album 2 – Haruki Kitahara
 Zettai Meikyuu Grimm – Ludwig Grimm

Tokusatsu
2014
 Ressha Sentai ToQger – Jack-in-the-box Shadow (ep. 20)

Dubbing

Live-action
American Pie Presents: Band Camp – Ernie Kaplowitz (Jason Earles)
Caravan of Courage: An Ewok Adventure – Mace Towani (Eric Walker)
Chronicle – Andrew Detmer (Dane DeHaan)
Detention – Mick Ashton (Corey Sevier)
Ewoks: The Battle for Endor – Mace Towani (Eric Walker)
Final Destination 2 (2006 TV Tokyo edition) – Rory Peters (Jonathan Cherry)
Finding Forrester – Clay (Damion Lee)
Geek Charming – Josh Rosen (Matt Prokop)
Girls – Charlie Dattolo (Christopher Abbott)
Gosford Park – Lord Rupert Standish (Laurence Fox)
High School Musical 3: Senior Year – Jimmy "Rocket Man" Zara (Matt Prokop)
JAG – Derrick Newton (Matt Newton)
Malcolm in the Middle – Jerome (Andrew James Allen)
Newcastle – Jesse Hoff (Lachlan Buchanan)
Pretty Little Liars – Garrett Reynolds (Yani Gellman)
Scott Pilgrim vs. the World – Scott Pilgrim (Michael Cera)
Sweet Sixteen – Side-kick (Gary Maitland)
The Way, Way Back – Duncan (Liam James)

Animation
Batman: The Brave and the Bold – Hawk
Courage the Cowardly Dog – Ratatouille

Drama CD
 17 Sai no Hisoka na Yokujou – Rin
 Aishitenai to Ittekure – Sakamoto
 Ai no Kotoba mo Shiranaide – Keiichi Kojima
 Ai to Bakudan 2: Kizudarake no Tenshi Domo ~Marked for Death Requiem ni Kabe wo Zenpen~ – Mitsuru Koga
 Ai wa Bara Iro no Kiss – Fisherman
 Akaya Akashiya Ayakashino – Tougo Tsubaki
 Baka na Inu Hodo Kawaikute – Kazuki Yano
 Barajou no Kiss – Itsushi Narumi
 Chiru Chiru, Michiru – Hiro Takahashi
 Chocolate Kiss
 Code Geass: Lelouch of the Rebellion R2 – Rolo Lamperouge
 Chiisana Koi no Melody – Nakazawa Tatsumi
 dear – Hanesto Subaru
 Girl's High Character Song & Drama as Takanori Shimotakanani
 Hanbun no Tsuki ga Noboru Sora – Looking Up at the Half Moon as Yūichi Ezaki
 Hetalia: Axis Powers – Finland
 Innai Kansen – Sou Tachibana
 Koi Dorobou wo Sagase!
 Koi no Iro – Nao
 Konna Otoko wa Aisareru – Keiichi Kojima
 Love-Berrish! – Kon Miyagi
 Melancholic Mellow Mellow – Yuuta
 Onmyō Taisenki Special Soundtrack – Ryūji Kamiya
 Oresama Teacher – Hayasaka
 Otokogokoro – Jun Shinomiya
 Otokonoko niwa Himitsu ga Aru – Chihaya Arisugawa
 Remastered Tracks Rockman Zero series - X
 Saint Beast Others 1 – Kanan
 Second Serenade
 Shimekiri no Sono Mae ni
 Shingouki Series – Orange no Kokoro – Muraji Tanaka
 Shin Megami Tensei: Devil Survivor – Protagonist
 Toritsu Mahō Gakuen – Tsukasa Takagi
 Wanko to Nyanko series – Junya Asou
 Warui Koto Shitai series – Aikawa Towa
 White Album 2 – Haruki Kitahara
 Yuki Kaen (Cute Person) – Yūichi Ezaki

Television
 Fuji TV's My Wife's Having an Affair This Week?
 Fanes (TBS's I'm Gonna Give It to You Straight! July 25, 2006)

References

External links
  
  
 
 Takahiro Mizushima at GamePlaza-Haruka Voice Acting Database 
 Takahiro Mizushima at Hitoshi Doi's Seiyuu Database
 
 

Japanese male voice actors
1976 births
Living people
People from Fujisawa, Kanagawa
Male actors from Kanagawa Prefecture
21st-century Japanese male actors